Datuk Seri Panglima Bung Moktar bin Radin (born 14 September 1959) is a Malaysian politician and lawyer who has served as the Deputy Chief Minister I and State Minister of Works of Sabah from 2020 to 2023. He has also served as the Member of Parliament (MP) for Kinabatangan since November 1999 and Member of the Sabah State Legislative Assembly (MLA) for Lamag since September 2020. A member of the United Malays National Organisation (UMNO), a component party of the Barisan Nasional (BN) coalition which is aligned with the ruling Perikatan Nasional (PN) coalition. He has also served as the State Chairman of UMNO and BN of Sabah since December 2018.

Education 
 Universiti Kebangsaan Malaysia
 Sandakan National Secondary School
 Kampung Bilit National Primary School, Kinabatangan

Career 
Before becoming a Member of Parliament, he served with the Sandakan Special Affairs Department (JASA) branch office (1987-1990) as an administrative and diplomatic officer, officer for the Majlis Amanah Rakyat (MARA), Sandakan branch office (1990-1992) and Political Secretary to the Sabah Minister of Finance (1994-1999).

Politics

Political posts
 Deputy Chairman of the Barisan Nasional Backbenchers Club (BNBBC) (2008-2020)
 Kinabatangan Member of Parliament (since 1999)
 Kinabatangan UMNO Division Chief (since 1996)
 Sabah UMNO Youth Information Chief (1991-1996)
 Kinabatangan UMNO Youth Chief (1991-1996)
 USNO Youth Exco (1980-1991)
 Kinabatangan USNO Division Youth Chief (1978-1990)

Election
The first time was as Barisan Nasional (BN) candidate in the 1994 Sabah state election for the Kuamut seat, an opposition stronghold at that time, Bung Mokhtar lost. He first won the 1999 general election after defeating Parti Bersatu Sabah (PBS) candidate Ali Latip Taha for the Kinabatangan parliamentary seat. He managed to retain the seat in 2004, 2008, 2013 and 2018 general elections. Since joining politics in 1978, he has been a representative of USNO or UMNO of BN candidates five times for Kinabatangan parliamentary seats.

Controversy and criticism 
Over five terms in Parliament, Bung Moktar has earned a reputation for controversial remarks and inflammatory behaviour.

Swearing in the parliament chamber
His most recent incident came on 7 August 2018, when he caused a stir with Willie Mongin (MP for ) in the Dewan Rakyat as the latter alleged that the Bung Moktar Radin had visited a casino, and he pointed his finger at Willie and accused him of being rude, demanding the statement be retracted.

After the incident, the Speaker of Dewan Rakyat warned the members to behave or they will be disciplined.

The incident became an internet meme focusing on the combination of Malay and Bung Moktar's broken English. His outburst in Malay was edited together with an insert from a different video of Malaysian former Prime Minister Muhyiddin Yassin saying "Can you speak English?", followed by Bung Moktar's continuation in English with the remark "Fuck you!".  The meme ended with the grammatically incorrect caption "he do speak english" accompanied with a cut piece of the song "Sanctuary Guardian - Earthbound" which is common in this format.

"Bocor" remark
He and Jasin MP Mohammad Said bin Yusof stirred controversy for making sexist comments and obscene comments to DAP's Batu Gajah MP, Fong Po Kuan in during a parliamentary session in 2007. He followed Mohammad Said by saying that Fong "leaked" every month (referring to the menstruation cycle in women), while they were debating about the leaks in the parliament building.

The pair offered an apology for their statements but were rejected by Fong because they were considered insincere.

Mockery of Karpal Singh as a disabled person
In the first sitting of Parliament after the 2008 elections, he called opposition politician Karpal Singh a "big monkey" after Singh called him the "Bigfoot from Kinabatangan."

Unauthorised polygamy

On 20 April 2010, Bung pleaded guilty to committing polygamy by taking a second wife without the consent of a marriage registrar. He was sentenced to a month's imprisonment, but was ultimately released on bail.

Urged Shahrizat to step down of NFC issues
On 3 December 2011, during the UMNO General Assembly 2011, he again urged Shahrizat Abdul Jalil to resign over a controversy surrounding the National Feedlot Centre (NFC) in Gemas, with an easy loan of RM250 million linked to her husband and her children. It was revealed that the NFC suffered losses but managed to purchase two luxury condominiums in Bangsar, as well as buying a Mercedes car worth RM534,622 and two parcels of land worth RM3,363,507 in Putrajaya. Deputy Inspector-General of Police Khalid Abu Bakar claimed that there was no element of breach of trust or fraud in the use of funds for NFC.

Hitler remark
He made international news for tweeting "Long Live Hitler" after Germany's 7–1 win over Brazil in the semi-final of the 2014 FIFA World Cup. His tweet stirred controversy with the German ambassador even calling it as "unacceptable."

FELCRA Berhad corruptions charges
On 3 May 2019, Bung Moktar was charged by the Malaysian Anti-Corruption Commission (MACC) with three counts of corruption amounting to total of RM2.8 million in June 2015 when he was director of FELCRA Berhad. His wife, Zizie Ezette was also charged with abetting her husband in the offences.

Election results

Honours

Honours of Malaysia
  :
  Grand Knight of the Order of Sultan Ahmad Shah of Pahang (SSAP) - Dato' Sri (2016)
  :
  Member of the Order of Kinabalu (ADK)
  Companion of the Order of Kinabalu (ASDK)
  Commander of the Order of Kinabalu (PGDK) - Datuk (2001)
  Grand Commander of the Order of Kinabalu (SPDK) – Datuk Seri Panglima (2021)

Honorary degrees 
  :
 Honorary Ph.D. degree in Political Science from Jesselton University College (2022)

References 

Living people
1958 births
People from Sabah
Kadazan-Dusun people
Malaysian Muslims
United Sabah National Organisation politicians
United Malays National Organisation politicians
Members of the Dewan Rakyat
Obscenity controversies
Commanders of the Order of Kinabalu
Grand Commanders of the Order of Kinabalu